The Pensioners' Party of the Republika Srpska (Serbian: Пензионерска Странка Републике Српске, Penzionerska Stranka Republike Srpske) is a Serbian political party in Bosnia and Herzegovina. 

Political parties in Republika Srpska
Pensioners' parties
Serb political parties in Bosnia and Herzegovina